Keating (Irish spelling: Céitinn) is an Irish and English family name.

Surname variations
Common variations on the Keating surname include Caton, Kaitting, Kating, Keatinge, Keaton, Keith, Keting, Keatting, McKeating, Keatings and O'Keating. A Spanish variation, Cienfuegos, also exists.

Notable people
 Ailsa Keating, French-British mathematician
 AnaLouise Keating (born 1961), academic, professor of Multicultural Women's and Gender Studies 
 Caron Keating (1962−2004), British TV personality
 Charles Keating (1923−2014), American lawyer, banker, best known for his involvement in the savings and loan scandal of the late 1980s, The Keating Five Scandal
 Charles Keating (actor) (1941−2014), English actor and narrator of audiobooks
 Chris Keating (musician) (born 1982), lead singer of American band Yeasayer
 Dan Keating (1902−2007), longest surviving veteran of the Irish War of Independence
 Dennis Keating (born 1940), Irish footballer
 Derek Keating (born 1955), Irish Fine Gael politician 
 Dominic Keating (born 1962), British actor
 Edward Keating (1875–1965), American newspaper editor and politician, U.S. representative for Colorado, who sponsored the Keating–Owen Child Labor Act of 1916
 Edward Michael Keating (1925–2003), American publisher, journalist, lawyer; founder of Ramparts magazine, member of the New Left movement.
 Edwin Joseph (Ted) Keating (1910−1987), academic and director of the Bank of New Zealand
 Frank Keating (born 1944), American politician; governor of Oklahoma
 Frank Keating (journalist) (1937−2013), English sports journalist and author
 Frank A. Keating (1895−1973), Major General of the United States Army
 Fred Keating (disambiguation), several people
 Geoffrey Keating (c.1569−c.1644), Irish theologian and historian
 Gladys Keating (1923-2014), Virginia businesswoman, civic activist and politician
 H. R. F. Keating (1926−2011), British novelist
 Henry Sheehy Keating (1775-1847), officer of the British Army during the French Revolutionary and Napoleonic Wars, father of Henry Singer Keating
 Henry Singer Keating (1804−1888), British lawyer and barrister
 Isabel Keating, American actress and singer
 John Keating (disambiguation), multiple people
 Jonathan Keating, British mathematician
 Joseph C. Keating Jr. (1950−2007), US psychologist
 Josephine E. Keating (1838−1908), American literary critic, musician music teacher
 Judith Keating (1957−2021), Canadian senator
 Justin Keating (1930−2009), Irish Labour Party politician
 Karl Keating (born 1950), American Catholic apologist
 Kenneth Keating (1900−1975), American politician, congressional representative and senator for New York, U.S. ambassador to India and Israel
 Larry Keating (1899−1963), American actor
 Michael Keating (actor) (born 1947), British actor
 Michael Keating (Irish politician) (born 1946), Irish politician
 Michael Keating (political scientist) (born 1950), political scientist
 Michael Keating (priest) (1793–1877), Irish Anglican priest; he expressed views on economics in Ireland.
 Michael Keating (public servant) (born 1940), Australian public servant
 Mike Keating (ice hockey) (born 1957), Canadian hockey player
 Paul Keating (born 1944), 24th Prime Minister of Australia
 Patrick N. Keating, theoretical physicist, of the Keating model
 Richard E. Keating (1941−2006), American astronomer, known for the Hafele–Keating experiment
 Richard Harte Keatinge (1825−1904), soldier
 Robert Brendon Keating (1924−2012), American diplomat
 Roly Keating (born 1961), chief executive of the British Library
 Ronan Keating (born 1977), Irish singer
 Seán Keating, (1889−1977), Irish painter, President of the Royal Hibernian Academy
 Sean P. Keating (1903−1976), Irish Republican Army veteran and Irish-American activist and political figure
 Timothy J. Keating (born 1948), American admiral
 Tim Keating (born 1961), Chief of the New Zealand Defence Force
 Thomas Keating (1923−2018), monk, founder of Centering Prayer movement
 Tom Keating (1917−1984), art restorer and forger
 Trenna Keating, Canadian actress
 William H. Keating (1799−1840), American geologist
 William J. Keating (born 1927), American politician, representative for Ohio's 1st district
 William R. Keating (born 1952), American politician, representative for Massachusetts' 9th congressional district
 Zoë Keating (born 1972), Canadian cellist and composer
 Maurice Keatinge (c.1761−1835), Irish landowner, soldier and politician
 Paffard Keatinge-Clay (born 1926), architect and sculptor

Fictional entities
 Lieutenant Colonel Harry Keating, in The Mauritius Command, a 1977 novel by Patrick O'Brian, based on the real life Henry Sheehy Keating
 John Keating, played by Robin Williams in 1989 film, Dead Poets Society
 Layla Keating, played by Greta Onieogou in the television series All American
 Peter Keating, in The Fountainhead, a 1943 novel by Ayn Rand
Multiple characters in How to Get Away With Murder:
Analise Keating, played by Viola Davis, fictional defense lawyer and law professor
Dr. Hannah Keating, Analise's sister-in-law, played by Marcia Gay Harden
Sam Keating, Analise's husband, played by Tom Verica
Keating 5, Analise Keating's interns, in How to Get Away With Murder (season 1)

Keating genealogy

DNA projects and one name studies 
 Keating DNA Project (hosted by FamilyTreeDNA.com, run by volunteers)

Published Keating genealogies 

 Keating of Wexford.

References

Surnames of Irish origin

de:Keating
fr:Keating
pl:Keating